HRZ may refer to:
 Croatian Air Force
 Croatian Republican Union
 Herzliya Airport, in Israel
 High Rainfall Zone, in Australia
 Harzandi dialect of the Tati language, spoken in Iran
 Zanzibar House of Representatives